Marylawn of the Oranges Academy, also known as Marylawn of the Oranges High School, was an all-girl, private, Roman Catholic college-preparatory high school for grades 7 through 12 located in South Orange, in Essex County, New Jersey, United States. Sponsored by the Sisters of Charity of Saint Elizabeth since its founding in 1935, Marylawn was located within the Roman Catholic Archdiocese of Newark. The school had been accredited by the Middle States Association of Colleges and Schools Commission on Elementary and Secondary Schools since 1962.

For over ten years before it closed, Marylawn had a 100% graduation and 100% college acceptance rate.

As of the 2009–10 school year, the school had an enrollment of 160 students and 21.9 classroom teachers (on an FTE basis), for a Student–teacher ratio of 7.3:1.

In October 2012, it was announced that the school would close in June 2013.

Since March 2018, the former site of the high school has been the home of the STEM Innovation Academy, a joint effort of Montclair State University, the New Jersey Institute of Technology, the Orange Board of Education and Orange, New Jersey.

Athletics
The Marylawn of the Oranges High School Lady Knights competed in the Super Essex Conference, following a reorganization of sports leagues in Northern New Jersey by the New Jersey State Interscholastic Athletic Association.

The 1985 tennis team won the Non-Public B state championship, defeating runner-up Mater Dei High School 3–2 in the finals.

Mission
The mission of Marylawn of the Oranges Academy is to prepare, motivate, and challenge young women, intellectually and morally, to assume their roles in society according to Catholic tradition and in the founding spirit of the Sisters of Charity of New Jersey.

Notable alumni
 Karen Hunter (born 1966), journalist, publisher, talk show host and the co-author of several books.

References

External links
 School Website
 

1935 establishments in New Jersey
2013 disestablishments in New Jersey
Girls' schools in New Jersey
Educational institutions established in 1935
Middle States Commission on Secondary Schools
Private high schools in Essex County, New Jersey
Roman Catholic Archdiocese of Newark
Defunct Catholic secondary schools in New Jersey
South Orange, New Jersey